Mark Jason Melligen (born April 6, 1986 in Bacolod, Negros Occidental, Philippines) is a Filipino former professional boxer.

Born in Bacolod, Melligen grew up in Cebu City, Cebu. He made his professional debut in 2006 and was at some time considered one of the top Filipino prospects in the junior welterweight division. After losing by knockout against Sebastian Andres Lujan in an upset in 2011, Melligen's career went downhill and he fought two more times in 2012 against little-known opponents, winning both matches by early TKO. Bothered by financial problems, Melligen became homeless and was arrested in June 2013 for drug use. He has not fought since this issue.

Fighting style
A southpaw, Melligen is known for his powerful right hook.

Career 
Melligen made his professional debut on April 30, 2006, defeating Roland Malonhao at the Island City Mall in Tagbilaran City, Bohol, Philippines.

On August 15, 2009, Mark "MJM Grand" Melligen took on Ernesto "Baby" Zepeda of Mexico in the undercard of “Pinoy Power 2” at the Hard Rock Hotel and Casino in Las Vegas. The Filipino boxer was supposed to face Michel Rosales of Mexico in the 10-round fight. However, Zepeda took the place of Rosales after the latter failed to secure a visa.

Melligen, who fought in the non-title welterweight bout, knocked out Zepeda in the fourth round. The referee Joe Cortez stopped the fight at 2:40 because the Mexican was bleeding on his right eye. Melligen’s TKO win improved his record to 16-1, with 12 coming by knockout while Zepeda fell at 39-13-4, with 32 knockouts. After receiving a warm welcome as he entered the ring, Melligen showed some aggressive moves in the first round such as uppercuts and left straight punches. The fighters continued along this way in the second round. In the third round, Melligen took the defensive but still aggressive style as Zepeda took the role of the aggressor. In the 4th, a left straight punch from Melligen sent the Mexican foe down. Referee Joe Cortez decides to stop the fight because of a laceration over Zepeda's right eye.

On November 13, 2009, Melligen was defeated by Mexican Michel Rosales (24-3-0) via a 10-round split decision.

In his next fight, Melligen defeated American Raymond Gatica on February 13, 2010, by TKO in the 6th round. This win marked the first victory for the Philippines in the Pinoy Power 3/Latin Fury 13 card. Melligen improved his record to 17-2 (13 KOs) and his foe experienced his first ever defeat, against 11 wins (with 6 KOs).

He fought Norberto Gonzales (18-1; 12 KO) of Mexico on April 10, 2010. The bout took place at the Hard Rock Hotel and Casino in Las Vegas, Nevada. Melligen won the fight by unanimous decision after 10 rounds, with the scores of 100-90 in all the judges' scorecards.

On July 1, 2011, Melligen faced Argentinian boxer Sebastian Andres Lujan at the Freeman Coliseum, San Antonio, Texas, USA. In what was supposed to be a big break for Melligen, the latter was caught cold, as he was knocked down four times by the underdog Lujan, once in the 6th, 7th, 8th & 9th rounds. Melligen eventually succumbed to Lujan's punches, losing the fight by knockout in the 9th round.

Following the Lujan fight, in the second half of 2012, Melligen fought two more times in the Philippines against little-known boxers, winning both matches by early TKO.

Controversy and arrest
After losing the fight against Sebastian Andres Lujan, Melligen became homeless and started having financial problems. In June 2013, a buy-bust operation in Mandaue City led to the arrest of Melligen,  Joembee “Ombie” Mark Sencio and his younger brother. Melligen was caught using methamphetamine and arrested for drug use along with the Sencio brothers.

During interrogation, Melligen said he was living in the streets and admitted he became a drug user. He also expressed frustration due to being neglected by his trainers and his career going downhill since the Lujan loss.

Professional boxing record

|-
|align="center" colspan=8|21 Wins (14 knockouts), 3 loss(s), 0 Draw, 0 No Contest
|-
|align=center style="border-style: none none solid solid; background: #e3e3e3"|Res.
|align=center style="border-style: none none solid solid; background: #e3e3e3"|Record
|align=center style="border-style: none none solid solid; background: #e3e3e3"|Opponent
|align=center style="border-style: none none solid solid; background: #e3e3e3"|Type
|align=center style="border-style: none none solid solid; background: #e3e3e3"|Rd., Time
|align=center style="border-style: none none solid solid; background: #e3e3e3"|Date
|align=center style="border-style: none none solid solid; background: #e3e3e3"|Location
|align=center style="border-style: none none solid solid; background: #e3e3e3"|Notes
|-align=center
|Win
|23-3
|align=left| Sapapetch Sor Sakaorat
|
|
|
|align=left|
|align=left|
|-align=center
|Win
|22-3
|align=left| Dondon Lapuz
|
|
|
|align=left|
|align=left|
|-align=center
|Loss || 21-3 ||align=left| Sebastian Andres Lujan
|
|
|
|align=left|
|align=left|
|- align=center
|Win
|21-2
|align=left| Gabriel Martinez
|
|
|
|align=left|
|align=left|
|-align=center

References

External links 
 

1986 births
Living people
Welterweight boxers
Southpaw boxers
Sportspeople from Bacolod
Filipino male boxers
Boxers from Negros Occidental
Southeast Asian Games medalists in boxing
Southeast Asian Games silver medalists for the Philippines
Competitors at the 2005 Southeast Asian Games